Antoine Pierre Cornelis "Teun" van Dijck (born 13 September 1963) is a Dutch politician and former management consultant and restaurateur. A member of the Party for Freedom (Partij voor de Vrijheid, PVV), he serves as a member of the House of Representatives since 30 November 2006. He focuses on matters of state pensions and other pensions. He is a childhood friend of PVV leader Geert Wilders.

Van Dijck was born in Venlo and performed various jobs, including management and consulting positions. He lived on Curaçao from 1993 to 2006, where among others he owned a restaurant and worked for the local government.

Van Dijck played saxophone under the stage name Tony Saxofony. He is married to Miss Curaçao 1993 Jasmin Clifton, with whom he has two children.

References 
  Parlement.com biography

External links 
  House of Representatives biography

1963 births
Living people
20th-century Dutch engineers
21st-century Dutch engineers
21st-century Dutch politicians
21st-century male musicians
21st-century saxophonists
Dutch management consultants
Dutch restaurateurs
Dutch saxophonists
Eindhoven University of Technology alumni
Male saxophonists
Members of the House of Representatives (Netherlands)
Party for Freedom politicians
People from Venlo